Doctor Faustus may refer to:

The character Faust
Dr. Johann Georg Faust (c. 1480 or 1466–1541), widely considered to be an inspiration for the character Faust
Doctor Faustus (play), a 1592 play, also known as The Tragical History of Doctor Faustus, by Christopher Marlowe
Goethe's Faust, a two-part play by Goethe
Doctor Faustus (novel), a 1947 novel by Thomas Mann
Doctor Faustus (1967 film), a 1967 film directed by Richard Burton and Nevill Coghill
Doctor Faustus (1982 film), a 1982 film directed by Franz Seitz
Doktor Faust, an opera by Ferruccio Busoni 
Doctor Faustus (comics), a character in the Marvel Universe
Dr Faustus, a folk music band that preceded Faustus
Il Dottor Faust, a 2018 play by Menotti Lerro

See also
Faustus (disambiguation)